Herbert Fortescue Lawford (15 May 1851 – 20 April 1925) was a former world No. 1 tennis player from Scotland who won the Men's Singles championship at Wimbledon in 1887, and was runner-up a record 5 times (shared with Arthur Gore).

Career

In the 1887 final, the native of Bayswater defeated Ernest Renshaw (also of Great Britain) in five sets: 1–6, 6–3, 3–6, 6–4, 6–4. He reached the finals of Wimbledon in 1880, 1884–86, and 1888.

Lawford won the first major men's doubles tennis tournament, the Oxford University Men's Doubles Championship, in 1879 partnering Lestocq Robert Erskine. This event was a precursor to the Wimbledon men's doubles championship, introduced in 1884, and it was played over the best of seven sets ending in a score of 4–6, 6–4, 6–5, 6–2, 3–6, 5–6, 7–5. In 1885 he won the singles title at the inaugural British Covered Court Championships.

Birth of the topspin: the Lawford-stroke
Lawford is said to be the first person to introduce "topspin" to the game of tennis. His formidable forehand was called 'the Lawford stroke'. Lawford made a more substantial contribution in technically advancing the game. He unveiled the “Lawford forehand,” introducing topspin into the sport with that revolutionary shot. Aggressive and unwavering, he was equipped with power, speed and uncanny accuracy. He was inducted into the International Tennis Hall of Fame in 2006.

Grand Slam finals

Singles (1 title, 5 runners-up)

Notes

References

External links
 
 

1851 births
1925 deaths
19th-century Scottish people
19th-century male tennis players
Scottish male tennis players
English male tennis players
People from Westminster
International Tennis Hall of Fame inductees
Wimbledon champions (pre-Open Era)
Grand Slam (tennis) champions in men's singles
British male tennis players
Tennis people from Greater London
People educated at Windlesham House School